Professor John David Woods, CBE (born 1939) is a British oceanographer.

He studied physics at Imperial College, London (1958–66), after which he was appointed principal research fellow at the Meteorological Office (1966–72), while leading the RN Operation Thermocline in which he pioneered underwater flow visualisation. Later he joined NERC as Director of Marine and Atmospheric Science (1986-1994), where he created the National Oceanography Centre at Southampton. He held professorships at Southampton University (1972–77), Kiel University (1977-86) and Imperial College London (1994- ), carrying out research into the seasonal boundary layer of the ocean and plankton ecosystem models, and modelling global container freight.

Woods has served on a number of international project committees, including GARP (Global Atmospheric Research Programme), WCRP (World Climate Research Programme0, IGBP (International GeoSphere-Biosphere Programme), EuroGOOS (European Global Ocean Observing System). He was co-chairman of the World Ocean Circulation Experiment. He was a lead author of the first report of the Intergovernmental Panel on Climate Change (IPCC), an organisation which was later awarded the 2007 Nobel Peace Prize jointly with Al Gore.

He is now (2015) Emeritus Professor of Oceanography & Complex Systems in the Faculty of Engineering, Department of Earth Science & Engineering, Imperial College London.  He is Adjunct Fellow of Linacre College, University of Oxford (1994-  ), and Emeritus Researcher of the CNR (Italian National Research Council).

Awards and honors 
 1968 Back Award of the Royal Geographical Society
 1968 L.G.Groves prize, Ministry of Defence. 
 1980 Hon D.Sc., University of Liège, Belgium
 1982 Silver medal, University of Helsinki
 1988 Foundation member, Academia Euopæa 
 1991 CBE
 1991 Hon D.Sc., University of Plymouth
 1992 William Gaskell Medal of the Royal Meteorological Society 
 1993  Silver medal, Plymouth Marine Sciences 
 1996 Founder's Medal of the Royal Geographical Society
 2004 Hon D.Sc., University of Southampton
 2011 British Library, Oral history, Voices of Science

Books 
 1971  Underwater science [with J.N.Lythgoe]
 1976  Underwater Research [E.Drew & J.N.Lythgoe) 
 2002  Ocean forecasting  [with N.Pinardi ] 
 2006  Benguela: Predicting a Large Marine Ecosystem [with V.Shannon, G.Hempel, P.Malanotte-Rizzoli, C.Moloney]

References

1939 births
Living people
People from Sussex
Alumni of Imperial College London
British oceanographers
Commanders of the Order of the British Empire